John Douglas  (6 March 1828 – 23 July 1904) was an Anglo-Australian politician and Premier of Queensland.

Early life
Douglas was born in London, the seventh son of Henry Alexander Douglas and his wife Elizabeth Dalzell, daughter of the Earl of Carnwath. His father, the third son of Sir William Douglas, 4th Baronet of Kelhead, was a brother of the sixth and seventh Marquesses of Queensberry. Douglas' parents died in 1837, he was educated at Edinburgh Academy, Rugby 1843-47 and Durham University where he graduated B.A. in 1850.

Douglas arrived in New South Wales with his brother Edward in 1851 and was appointed a gold-fields commissioner, but gave this up to enter on a pastoral life.

Politics
Douglas was elected member for the Darling Downs and afterwards for Camden in the New South Wales Legislative Assembly until resigning on 17 July 1861. He moved to Queensland in 1863.

On 12 May 1863 he was elected as member for Port Curtis in the Legislative Assembly of Queensland. He resigned on 1 February 1866, in order to be appointed on to the Queensland Legislative Council, which occurred on 22 February 1866.

On 1 March 1866 became postmaster-general in the first Macalister ministry.

He was elected to the Legislative Assembly again as member for Eastern Downs. He took the portfolio of colonial treasurer in the second Macalister ministry in December 1866, but in May 1867 changed this position for that of secretary for public works. He was postmaster-general in the Charles Lilley ministry from December 1868 to November 1869, when he resigned to become Agent-General for Queensland in London.

In 1871 Douglas returned to Queensland and became insolvent on 23 February 1872. Douglas was returned for Maryborough at the election held in 1875. He was secretary for public lands in the Thorn ministry from June 1876 until March 1877, when he became premier and was given the honour of C.M.G. His party was defeated at the election held in January 1879 and Douglas gave up politics. Lewis Adolphus Bernays claimed Douglas had more success as a clever political wire-puller behind the scenes than he had in parliament.

Later life
In 1865  Augustus Charles Gregory, Maurice Charles O'Connell and Douglas applied for a special grant of land to erect a Masonic Hall in Brisbane. This was granted on 15 January 1865.

He was for some time on the literary staff of the Brisbane Courier, and in 1885 was appointed government resident and magistrate at Thursday Island. After the death of Sir Peter Scratchley in December 1885 Douglas acted as special commissioner for the protectorate of British New Guinea for nearly three years (1886–88), and showed tact and ability in his dealings with the local inhabitants.

In 1888 Douglas returned to his old position on Thursday Island. He visited England in 1902 and on his return continued his work until his death.

Port Douglas is named in his honour.

Personal life
Douglas was married twice, first on 22 January 1861 to Mary Ann, daughter of the Rev. William West Simpson, who was killed in a carriage accident 23 November 1876, and for the second time in 1877 to Sarah, daughter of Michael Hickey, with whom he had four sons:

 Robert Johnstone Douglas (1883–1972), was appointed a judge of the Supreme Court of Queensland in 1923  and married Annie Alice May Ball, daughter of Townsville pioneer Andrew Ball
 Edward Archibald Douglas (1877–1947), was appointed a judge of the Supreme Court of Queensland  in March 1929 
 Henry Alexander Cecil Douglas (1879–1917), a member of the Queensland Legislative Assembly.
 Hugh Maxwell Douglas (1881–1918), died 8 April 1918 aged 37, a lieutenant in 47th Battalion, Australian Army, while fighting in World War I at Dernacourt in France.

Douglas died on 23 July 1904 at Thursday Island.

Descendants
Through his son Henry, he was a grandfather of Alexander Michael Douglas (b. 1926), and a great-grandfather of Alexander Rodney Douglas, formerly a member of the Queensland Legislative Assembly seat of Gaven.

See also
 Members of the Queensland Legislative Assembly, 1860–1863; 1863–1867; 1867–1868; 1868–1870; 1873–1878; 1878–1883
 Members of the Queensland Legislative Council, 1860–1869
 List of Durham University people

References

External links

1828 births
1904 deaths
People educated at Edinburgh Academy
People educated at Rugby School
Premiers of Queensland
Australian Companions of the Order of St Michael and St George
Members of the New South Wales Legislative Assembly
Australian people of Scottish descent
English people of Scottish descent
Alumni of University College, Durham
Members of the Queensland Legislative Assembly
Members of the Queensland Legislative Council
Treasurers of Queensland
19th-century Australian politicians
Gold commissioners
19th-century Australian public servants
English emigrants to colonial Australia